Samarth Singh (born 11 September 1991) is an Indian cricketer. He made his first-class debut for Uttar Pradesh in the 2016–17 Ranji Trophy on 13 October 2016. On 20 and 21 October 2016, he scored his maiden first-class century in his second match, scoring 187 runs against Tamil Nadu. On 6 October 2018, he scored his first century in List A cricket, with an unbeaten 115 against Andhra Pradesh.

References

External links
 

1991 births
Living people
Indian cricketers
Uttar Pradesh cricketers
Cricketers from Delhi